Velua is the fifth full-length album by the Dutch pagan / Viking / folk metal band Heidevolk. It was released on March 20, 2015 through Napalm Records.

Velua is a concept album that offers a dark, mythical picture of the Veluwe woodlands, in the province of Gelderland.

Track listing

Personnel
 Joost Vellenknotscher - drums
 Rowan Roodbaert - bass
 Mark Splintervuyscht - vocals
 Reamon Bomenbreker - guitars
 Lars Vogel - vocals
 Kevin Olinga - guitars

Guest musicians
 Sebastiaan Pongers - cello
 Hanna van Gorcum - violin, nyckelharpa
 Madicken de Vries - Soprano vocals
 Irma Vos - viola, violin
 Klaartje Horbach-van Zwoll - viola
 Rowan Schuddeboom - violin

Production
 Awik Balaian - artwork, design
 Jochem Jacobs - engineering, mastering, mixing, producer
 Bouke Visser - producer

References

2015 albums
Heidevolk albums
Napalm Records albums